Luis Guillermo Madrigal Gutiérrez (born 10 February 1993) is a Mexican professional footballer who plays as a forward for Primera División club FAS.

Club career

Monterrey
He made his senior team debut on October 7, 2011, as a substitute in a match against Estudiantes Tecos in a 3 - 2 win of Monterrey.

Alebrijes de Oaxaca
On 8 June 2017, Madrigal was signed by Oaxaca.
Madrigal was the top-scorer of the Apertura 2017 Ascenso MX season with 12 goals.

Honours
Monterrey
CONCACAF Champions League: 2010–11, 2011–12, 2012–13

Oaxaca
Ascenso MX: Apertura 2017

Mexico U20
CONCACAF U-20 Championship: 2013

Individual
Ascenso MX Top Scorer: Apertura 2017

References

External links
 Team profile
 

1993 births
Living people
Mexico under-20 international footballers
Mexico youth international footballers
Footballers from Sinaloa
C.F. Monterrey players
Atlante F.C. footballers
Venados F.C. players
Querétaro F.C. footballers
Liga MX players
Mexican footballers
Association football forwards